Brownstone is a brown Triassic–Jurassic sandstone that was historically a popular building material. The term is also used in the United States and Canada to refer to a townhouse clad in this or any other aesthetically similar material.

Types

Apostle Island brownstone
In the 19th century, Basswood Island, Wisconsin was the site of a quarry run by the Bass Island Brownstone Company which operated from 1868 into the 1890s. The brownstone from this and other quarries in the Apostle Islands was in great demand, with brownstone from Basswood Island being used in the construction of the first Milwaukee County Courthouse in the 1860s.

Hummelstown brownstone

Hummelstown brownstone is extremely popular along the East Coast of the United States, with numerous government buildings throughout West Virginia, Pennsylvania, New York, Maryland, and Delaware being faced entirely with the stone, which comes from the Hummelstown Quarry in Hummelstown, Pennsylvania, a small town outside of Harrisburg, Pennsylvania. The Hummelstown Quarry is the largest provider of brownstone on the east coast. Typically, the stone was transported out of Hummelstown through the Brownstone and Middletown Railroad.

Portland brownstone

Portland brownstone,  Connecticut River Brownstone, is also very popular. The stone from quarries located in Portland, Connecticut and nearby localities was used in a number of landmark buildings in Chicago, Boston, New York City, Philadelphia, New Haven, Hartford, Washington D.C., and Baltimore.

New Jersey brownstone

Quarries from the Passaic Formation in northern New Jersey once supplied most of the brownstone used in New York City and New Jersey.

South Wales brownstone
Devonian aged sandstone is commonly used in Southern Wales.

Use in urban private residences
There are many brownstones throughout numerous New York City neighborhoods, especially in the Brooklyn neighborhoods of Park Slope, Clinton Hill, Fort Greene, Cobble Hill, Carroll Gardens, Boerum Hill, Gowanus, Windsor Terrace, Prospect Heights, Crown Heights, Brooklyn Heights, Bedford Stuyvesant, and Sunset Park. Smaller concentrations exist in parts of Bay Ridge, Williamsburg, Bushwick, Greenpoint, and Prospect Lefferts Gardens.

Brownstones are also scattered throughout Manhattan from the Lower East Side to Washington Heights, with notable concentrations in the Upper West Side, Upper East Side, Harlem and East Harlem. In Queens and The Bronx, the historic districts of Long Island City and Mott Haven also host many brownstones. Brownstones also predominate in some Hudson County neighborhoods directly across the Hudson River from Manhattan, especially in Hoboken and around Van Vorst Park and Hamilton Park in Jersey City. New York City brownstones can cost several million dollars to purchase. A typical architectural detail of brownstones in and around New York City is the stoop, a steep staircase rising from the street to the entrance on what amounts to almost the second-floor level. This design was seen as hygienic at the time many were built, because the streets were so foul with animal waste.

It has become fashionable to use the term "brownstone" to refer to almost any townhouse from a certain period, even though they may not have been built of brownstone. For example, many townhouses in Boerum Hill, Brooklyn, are built of brick, but have concrete masonry cladding which resembles stone. There are also many brick townhouses that have brownstone-built stoops throughout the outer boroughs. Such neighborhoods that consist of these homes are Borough Park, Dyker Heights, Bensonhurst, Bath Beach, Sunset Park, Kensington, Flatbush, Midwood, East New York, Cypress Hills in Brooklyn, Ridgewood, Glendale, Astoria, Woodhaven in Queens, and Longwood and Morrisania in the Bronx.

The Rittenhouse Square and Fairmount neighborhoods of Philadelphia also include examples of brownstone architecture. Many of these homes have been converted into apartment buildings.

Back Bay, Boston, is known for its Victorian brownstone homes – considered some of the best-preserved examples of 19th-century urban design in the United States.

Although some brownstones exist in Chicago, a similar residential form known as "greystones" is far more prevalent. A greystone is a type of residential structure that utilizes Indiana limestone for its facade, regardless of its overall architectural style. As in Brooklyn, there is a "Greystone Belt" in Chicago, with large numbers of such structures located in the south and northwest quadrants of the city. It is estimated that around 30,000 of Chicago's greystones built between 1890 and 1930 are still standing.

Use in colonial country homes
Brownstone, also known as freestone because it can be cut freely in any direction, was used by early Pennsylvanian Quakers to construct stone mills and mill houses. In central Pennsylvania, some 1700s-era structures survive, including a residence known as the Quaker Mill House.

Use in tombstone making
Brownstone was prized by tombstone carvers in southern New England, and Mid Atlantic region during the Colonial era.  Table-type memorials in particular were often carved out of brownstone as well as regular headstones.  Especially valued for being easy to carve, those same characteristics often resulted in stones being less durable and prone to heavy erosion and wear over time, especially when compared to slate or schist graves of the same time period. Brownstone began losing popularity among carvers during the first few decades of the 1800s owing to the rising popularity of marble though it continued to be used for obelisks and other grave monuments until much later.  Brownstone used for headstones was usually quarried from the Connecticut River Valley and New Jersey, and many grave carvers especially in Connecticut, New York and New Jersey carved from it.

Quality
Brownstone was deemed "not really much good as a building material" by Vincent Scully, professor emeritus of the history of art at Yale University. Brownstone was popular because it is unusually easy to carve and quarry, but these qualities also made houses clad in it susceptible to weathering and damage over time.

See also
Besançon, France, noted for building façades made of stone from the Chailluz Quarry
Dimension stone
Greystone
Hummelstown Brownstone Company
Railroad apartment
Sandstone

References

External links
NPS Article on the Brownstone quarries of Wisconsin's Apostle Islands.
Website devoted to the Weser brownstone quarries from Germany being imported into the US.
 "After Fight, a Brooklyn Brownstone's Costly Rescue" The New York Times, March 31, 2010.
Website devoted to the colonial-era Quaker Mill House in Pennsylvania.

Rittenhouse Square, Philadelphia
Fairmount, Philadelphia
Back Bay, Boston
19th-century architecture
Sandstone
House styles
Culture of New York City
Building stone